Branchinella simplex is a species of crustacean in the family Thamnocephalidae. It is endemic to Australia.

References

Branchiopoda
Freshwater crustaceans of Australia
Vulnerable fauna of Australia
Crustaceans described in 1924
Taxonomy articles created by Polbot